Jennifer Parilla (born January 9, 1981) is an American trampolinist who was born in Newport Beach, California.  She was the first and only American to qualify to the 2000 Summer Olympics in Sydney as a trampolinist when the sport debuted; and finished in 9th place.  She competed for the US at the 2004 Athens Summer Olympics.

She was on the national team for eleven years from 1993 to 2004; her favorite event was trampoline but she also competed successfully on the double mini. She was the National Champion in 1998, 2000, 2002, 2003, and 2004 on the trampoline, and on the double mini in 1998 and 1999.  She earned national titles in 1993, 1994, 1995, 1996, and 1998 in synchronized trampoline, bringing her total national title count to twelve.

She was inducted into the USA Gymnastics Hall of Fame in 2010.

Personal life
Jennifer's hometown is Lake Forest, California but she now resides in Newport Beach. She trained with Team Everybody gymnastics club and was coached by Lionel Rangel. Jennifer attended Orange Coast College and California State Polytechnic University in Pomona.

Jennifer is one of two children to Paul and Jan Parilla; she has an older brother named Steve.  She is currently the Trampoline and Tumbling Director at National Gymnastics Training Center in Aliso Viejo, California.

International competition

2003 World Championships, Hannover, GER; 16th-Trampoline
2003 World Cup, Prague, CZE; 4th-Trampoline
2003 World Cup, Ostend, BEL; 18th-Trampoline
2003 Canada Cup, Oakville, O.N., CAN; 8th-Trampoline
2002 World Cup, Mykolayiv, UKR; 11th – Trampoline
2001 World Championships, Odense, DEN; 19th – Trampoline
2000 Summer Olympics, Sydney, AUS; 9th-Trampoline
2000 World Cup, Sydney, AUS; 6th – Trampoline (4th vs. Olympic Field)
2000 Olympic Test Event, Sydney, AUS; 6th – Trampoline (4th vs. Olympic Field)
1999 Olympic Selection; 9th – Trampoline
1999 World Championships, Sun City, RSA; 7th – Synchro, 17th – Trampoline
1999 French Nationals, Toulouse, FRA; 1st – Synchro
1998 World Championships, Sydney, AUS; 2nd – Double Mini, 3rd – Team Double Mini
1997 Trampoline World cup final, Frankfurt, GER; 5th – Trampoline
1997 Indo-Pacific Championships, Durban, RSA; 3rd – Double mini
1997 Trampoline World Cup Final, Sydney, AUS; 4th – Trampoline
1996 Trampoline World Cup, Frankfurt, GER; 2nd Trampoline
1996 World Championships, Vancouver, CAN; 6th – Synchro, 7th – Trampoline
1995 Trampoline World Cup, Vancouver, CAN; 7th – Trampoline
1994 World Championships, Porto, POR; 1st – Team Double Mini
1994 World Age Group Games, Vila De Conde, POR; 1st - Trampoline 2nd – Double Mini

National Competition
2004 U.S. Olympic Team Trials, San Jose, Calif.; 1st - Trampoline
2004 Visa U.S. Championships, Nashville, Tenn.; 1st - Trampoline
2003 U.S. Championships, Sacramento, Calif.; 1st – Trampoline
2003 Winter Classic, Tampa, Fla.; 2nd - Trampoline
2002 National Championships, Cleveland, Ohio; 1st – Trampoline
2002 U.S. Elite Challenge, Indianapolis, Ind.; 1st – Trampoline
2002 Winter Classic, Indianapolis, Ind.; 4th – Trampoline
2001 National Championships, San Antonio, Texas; 11th - Trampoline
2000 National Championships, St. Louis, Mo.; 1st – Trampoline
1999 U.S. World Team Trials, Sacramento, Calif.; 1st – Trampoline, 1st – Synchro - 2nd Double Mini
1999 U.S. World Team Trials, Knoxville, Tenn.; 1st – trampoline, 1st – Double Mini, 1st - Synchro
1999 National Championships, Anaheim, Calif. ; 1st – Double Mini
1998 National Championships, St. Paul, Minn.; 1st – Trampoline, 1st – Syncro, 1st – Double Mini
1996 National Championships, Phoenix Ariz.; 1st – Synchro, 3rd – Trampoline
1995 National Championships, Denver, Colo.; 1st – Synchro, 2nd – Trampoline, 3rd – Double Mini
1994 National Championships, Nashville, Tenn.; 1st - Synchro, 4th – Double Mini
1993 National Championships; San Diego, Calif.; 1st - Synchro

References

External links
 
 Jennifer Parilla at US Gymnastics Hall of Fame
 
 

1981 births
Living people
Sportspeople from Newport Beach, California
American female trampolinists
Gymnasts at the 2004 Summer Olympics
Olympic gymnasts of the United States
21st-century American women